A garage apartment (also called a coach house, garage suite or in Australia, Fonzie flat) is an apartment built within the walls of, or on top of, the garage of a house. The garage may be attached or a separate building from the main house, but will have a separate entrance and may or may not have a communicating door to the main house.  A garage apartment is one type of "accessory dwelling unit" or ADU, a term used by architects, urban planners and in zoning ordinances to identify apartments smaller than the main dwelling on one lot or parcel of land. Other examples of ADU's include granny flats, English basements, mother-in-law suites, and auxiliary units.

In the U.S., garage apartments are frequently found in older urban areas, either in secondary buildings designed for such purposes (sometimes called 'guest' or 'carriage' houses), or converted into residential units from their original use. ADUs may be regulated by size, occupancy, lot size, core features (such as kitchens or bathrooms), other building codes and parking allotment.

The idea of integrating garage apartments into urban planning is a key aspect of new urbanism, although many jurisdictions in the U.S. prohibit new construction of or occupancy of ADUs except for relatives.

References

External links
 

Apartment types
Garages (residential)
Real estate terminology